The Five Minutes Short EP is the first release by the band Ghosty from Lawrence, Kansas. It was released February 1, 2002.

Track listing
 "Stopping Short of Getting There"  	  
 "Laurel Oak"
 "Five Short Minutes"	 	  	  
 "Another Straight Sonnet"	 	  	  
 "Faith"
 "1900 Watts of Love is Not Enough"

External links
Ghosty official website

2002 debut EPs
Ghosty albums